April 24 - Eastern Orthodox liturgical calendar - April 26

All fixed commemorations below are observed on May 8 by Eastern Orthodox Churches on the Old Calendar.

For April 25th, Orthodox Churches on the Old Calendar commemorate the Saints listed on April 12.

Saints

 Holy Apostle and Evangelist Mark, first Bishop of Alexandria (63)
 Saint Anianas, second Bishop of Alexandria (86)
 Martyr Nike (Nice), by the sword (303)
 Hieromartyr Stephen II, Patriarch of Antioch (479)
 Saint Macedonius II, Patriarch of Constantinople (516)
 The Venebrable Eight Anchorites who were martyred by the sword.

Pre-Schism Western saints

 Martyrs Evodius, Hermogenes and Callista, in Syracuse in Sicily.
 Saint Phaebadius (Fiari), a Bishop of Agen in the south of France, who succeeded in stamping out Arianism in Gaul, together with his friend St Hilary of Poitiers (c. 392)
 Saint Maughold (Macaille), a disciple of Mel who became Bishop of Croghan in Offaly in Ireland, the patron saint of the Isle of Man (c. 489)
 Saint Rusticus, Archbishop of Lyon (501)
 Saint Erminus, a monk at Lobbes Abbey in Belgium and later Abbot, Bishop and Confessor (737)
 Saint Mella, the mother of two saints, Cannech and Tigernach, who became a nun and Abbess of Doire-Melle (Rossclogher Abbey), in County Leitrim (c. 780)
 Saint Heribaldus, Monk and abbot of the monastery of St Germanus in Auxerre in France and later bishop of the same city (c. 857)
 Saint Robert of Syracuse, Abbot of a monastery in Syracuse in Sicily (c. 1000)

Post-Schism Orthodox saints

 Saint Sylvester of Obnorsk, Abbot of Obnora Monastery (1379)
 Venerable Basil, Elder of Poiana Mărului, Romania (1767)
 Venerable Bassian the Blind, Hiero-schema-monk of the Kiev Caves (1827)

New martyrs and confessors

 Hieromartyr Sergius Rokhletsov, Protopresbyter, of Veliky Ustyug (1938)

Other commemorations

 Commemoration of the Consecration of the Church of the all-praised Apostle Peter, located near the Cathedral of Hagia Sophia in Constantinople.
 Icon of the Mother of God of Constantinople (1071)
 Repose of Elder Philotheus (Zervakos) of Paros (1980)

Icon gallery

Notes

References

Sources
 April 25 / May 8. Orthodox Calendar (pravoslavie.ru).
 May 8 / April 25. Holy Trinity Russian Orthodox Church (A Parish of the Patriarchate of Moscow).
 April 25. OCA - The Lives of the Saints.
 The Autonomous Orthodox Metropolia of Western Europe and the Americas. St. Hilarion Calendar of Saints for the year of our Lord 2004. St. Hilarion Press (Austin, TX). p. 31.
 April 25. Latin Saints of the Orthodox Patriarchate of Rome.
 The Roman Martyrology. Transl. by the Archbishop of Baltimore. Last Edition, According to the Copy Printed at Rome in 1914. Revised Edition, with the Imprimatur of His Eminence Cardinal Gibbons. Baltimore: John Murphy Company, 1916. pp. 116–117.
 Rev. Richard Stanton. A Menology of England and Wales, or, Brief Memorials of the Ancient British and English Saints Arranged According to the Calendar, Together with the Martyrs of the 16th and 17th Centuries. London: Burns & Oates, 1892. p. 182.
Greek Sources
 Great Synaxaristes:  25 Απριλίου. Μεγασ Συναξαριστησ.
  Συναξαριστής. 25 Απριλίου. ecclesia.gr. (H Εκκλησια Τησ Ελλαδοσ). 
Russian Sources
  8 мая (25 апреля). Православная Энциклопедия под редакцией Патриарха Московского и всея Руси Кирилла (электронная версия). (Orthodox Encyclopedia - Pravenc.ru).
  25 апреля (ст.ст.) 8 мая 2013 (нов. ст.) . Русская Православная Церковь Отдел внешних церковных связей.

April in the Eastern Orthodox calendar